The 1997–98 NBA season was the Nuggets’ 22nd season in the National Basketball Association, and 31st season as a franchise. The Nuggets received the fifth overall pick in the 1997 NBA draft, and selected Tony Battie out of Texas Tech. During the off-season, the team acquired Eric Williams from the Boston Celtics, acquired Johnny Newman, Joe Wolf and top draft pick Danny Fortson from the Milwaukee Bucks, first round draft pick Bobby Jackson from the Seattle SuperSonics, second round draft pick Eric Washington from the Orlando Magic, and signed free agent Dean Garrett. However, Williams suffered a devastating knee injury after only just four games, and was out for the remainder of the season, averaging 19.8 points and 5.3 rebounds per game, while Bryant Stith only played just 31 games due to ankle and foot injuries. At midseason, the team signed free agent Cory Alexander, who was previously released by the San Antonio Spurs.

The Nuggets set numerous unwanted records during this season, which started off with the team losing their first twelve games under new head coach Bill Hanzlik. The Nuggets finished with the league's worst record at 11–71, which was also the team's worst record in franchise history. Their eleven wins equaled the third-fewest in an 82-game NBA season along with the 1992–93 Dallas Mavericks, and just like the Mavericks were for a long time viewed as likely to beat the 1972–73 Philadelphia 76ers record of winning only nine games in a full season, and the 2015–16 76ers, who only won just ten games. Incidentally, the NFL's Denver Broncos had won the Super Bowl earlier in 1998 and would go towards the Super Bowl again in the same year when this occurred. After 40 games and a dreadful 23-game losing streak, which was tied with the 1995–96 Vancouver Grizzlies, the Nuggets had a 2–38 record (winning percentage .050), a mark equalled only by the 1993–94 Mavericks, With the team holding a 4–42 record at the All-Star break, General Manager Allan Bristow was fired. The Nuggets later on lost sixteen consecutive games between February and March, before finally avoiding a possibility of the worst-ever NBA record against the Golden State Warriors on March 27.

Newman played a sixth man role, leading the team in scoring with 14.7 points per game off the bench, while LaPhonso Ellis averaged 14.3 points and 7.2 rebounds per game, and Jackson provided the team with 11.6 points, 4.7 assists and 1.5 steals per game, and was selected to the NBA All-Rookie Second Team. In addition, Fortson averaged 10.2 points and 5.6 rebounds per game, while Anthony Goldwire contributed 9.2 points and 3.4 assists per game, Battie provided with 8.4 points and 5.4 rebounds per game, Garrett averaged 7.3 points, 7.9 rebounds and 1.6 blocks per game, Washington contributed 7.7 points per game, and Stith contributed 7.6 points per game. The Nuggets had the worst team defensive rating in the NBA. 

The unfortunate season meant Hanzlik was fired after a single season in charge of the team. Following the season, Ellis signed as a free agent with the Atlanta Hawks, while Newman re-signed with the Cleveland Cavaliers, Garrett and Jackson were both traded to the Minnesota Timberwolves, Battie was dealt to the Los Angeles Lakers, who then traded him to the Boston Celtics several months later, and Goldwire and Wolf were both released to free agency.

In his 2007 study The NBA from Top to Bottom, basketball enthusiast Kyle Wright argued that in fact the 1997–98 Nuggets were a worse team than the 1972–73 76ers, saying that they played a worse schedule in the Midwest Division than the 1972–73 76ers did in their Atlantic Division where a dominant Boston Celtics team was played seven times by the 76ers. In contrast, Wright says, "the Nuggets got to play the 62–20 Utah Jazz only four times".

Draft picks

Roster

Regular season

Season standings

z – clinched division title
y – clinched division title
x – clinched playoff spot

Record vs. opponents

Game log

|- align="center" bgcolor="edbebf"
| 1 || October 31 || San Antonio Spurs || 96–107 || McNichols Sports Arena || 0–1

|- align="center" bgcolor="edbebf"
| 2 || November 1 || @ Utah Jazz || 84–102 || Delta Center || 0–2
|- align="center" bgcolor="edbebf"
| 3 || November 4 || Washington Wizards || 96–120 || McNichols Sports Arena || 0–3
|- align="center" bgcolor="edbebf"
| 4 || November 7 || Utah Jazz || 89–91 || McNichols Sports Arena || 0–4
|- align="center" bgcolor="edbebf"
| 5 || November 11 || @ New York Knicks || 90–93 || Madison Square Garden || 0–5
|- align="center" bgcolor="edbebf"
| 6 || November 12 || @ Boston Celtics || 86–96 || Fleet Center || 0–6
|- align="center" bgcolor="edbebf"
| 7 || November 14 || @ Orlando Magic || 85–103 || Orlando Arena || 0–7
|- align="center" bgcolor="edbebf"
| 8 || November 15 || @ Miami Heat || 93–96 || Miami Arena || 0–8
|- align="center" bgcolor="edbebf"
| 9 || November 18 || Vancouver Grizzlies || 87–100 || McNichols Sports Arena || 0–9
|- align="center" bgcolor="edbebf"
| 10 || November 21 || @ Vancouver Grizzlies || 96–99 || General Motors Place || 0–10
|- align="center" bgcolor="edbebf"
| 11 || November 22 || Seattle SuperSonics || 80–84 || McNichols Sports Arena || 0–11
|- align="center" bgcolor="edbebf"
| 12 || November 25 || @ Sacramento Kings || 93–97 || ARCO Arena || 0–12
|- align="center" bgcolor="bbffbb"
| 13 || November 28 || Minnesota Timberwolves || 95–84 || McNichols Sports Arena || 1–12

|- align="center" bgcolor="edbebf"
| 14 || December 2 || @ Houston Rockets || 101–112 || The Summit || 1–13
|- align="center" bgcolor="edbebf"
| 15 || December 3 || Los Angeles Lakers || 89–107 || McNichols Sports Arena || 1–14
|- align="center" bgcolor="edbebf"
| 16 || December 5 || Indiana Pacers || 85–96 || McNichols Sports Arena || 1–15
|- align="center" bgcolor="bbffbb"
| 17 || December 7 || Los Angeles Clippers || 100–92 || McNichols Sports Arena || 2–15
|- align="center" bgcolor="edbebf"
| 18 || December 9 || @ Detroit Pistons || 83–92 || The Palace of Auburn Hills || 2–16
|- align="center" bgcolor="edbebf"
| 19 || December 10 || @ Cleveland Cavaliers || 106–119 || Gund Arena || 2–17
|- align="center" bgcolor="edbebf"
| 20 || December 12 || @ Phoenix Suns || 81–102 || America West Arena || 2–18
|- align="center" bgcolor="edbebf"
| 21 || December 13 || @ New Jersey || 95–133 || Continental Airlines Arena || 2–19
|- align="center" bgcolor="edbebf"
| 22 || December 16 || San Antonio Spurs || 85–99 || McNichols Sports Arena || 2–20
|- align="center" bgcolor="edbebf"
| 23 || December 18 || @ Seattle SuperSonics || 106–119 || KeyArena || 2–21
|- align="center" bgcolor="edbebf"
| 24 || December 20 || Phoenix Suns || 81–102 || McNichols Sports Arena || 2–22
|- align="center" bgcolor="edbebf"
| 25 || December 23 || @ Golden State Warriors || 75–87 || The Arena in Oakland || 2–23
|- align="center" bgcolor="edbebf"
| 26 || December 26 || Golden State Warriors || 120–131 || McNichols Sports Arena || 2–24
|- align="center" bgcolor="edbebf"
| 27 || December 27 || @ Los Angeles Clippers || 103–105 || Los Angeles Memorial Sports Arena || 2–25
|- align="center" bgcolor="edbebf"
| 28 || December 30 || Utah Jazz || 99–132 || McNichols Sports Arena || 2–26

|- align="center" bgcolor="edbebf"
| 29 || January 2 || Houston Rockets || 115–116 OT || McNichols Sports Arena || 2–27
|- align="center" bgcolor="edbebf"
| 30 || January 3 || @ Minnesota Timberwolves || 87–109 || Target Center || 2–28
|- align="center" bgcolor="edbebf"
| 31 || January 6 || @ Dallas Mavericks || 90–108 || Reunion Arena || 2–29
|- align="center" bgcolor="edbebf"
| 32 || January 7 || @ San Antonio Spurs || 89–96 || Alamodome || 2–30
|- align="center" bgcolor="edbebf"
| 33 || January 9 || Miami Heat || 79–98 || McNichols Sports Arena || 2–31
|- align="center" bgcolor="edbebf"
| 34 || January 13 || Orlando Magic || 84–98 || McNichols Sports Arena || 2–32
|- align="center" bgcolor="edbebf"
| 35 || January 14 || @ Los Angeles Lakers || 114–132 || Great Western Forum || 2–33
|- align="center" bgcolor="edbebf"
| 36 || January 16 || Cleveland Cavaliers || 74–99 || McNichols Sports Arena || 2–34
|- align="center" bgcolor="edbebf"
| 37 || January 18 || @ Portland Trail Blazers || 82–94 || Rose Garden Arena || 2–35
|- align="center" bgcolor="edbebf"
| 38 || January 20 || @ Vancouver Grizzlies || 77–88 || General Motors Place || 2–36
|- align="center" bgcolor="edbebf"
| 39 || January 21 || Detroit Pistons || 67–87 || McNichols Sports Arena || 2–37
|- align="center" bgcolor="edbebf"
| 40 || January 23 || @ Phoenix Suns || 77–93 || America West Arena || 2–38
|- align="center" bgcolor="bbffbb"
| 41 || January 24 || @ Los Angeles Clippers || 99–81 || Los Angeles Memorial Sports Arena || 3–38
|- align="center" bgcolor="edbebf"
| 42 || January 27 || New Jersey Nets || 87–120 || McNichols Sports Arena || 3–39
|- align="center" bgcolor="edbebf"
| 43 || January 29 || Toronto Raptors || 80–84 || McNichols Sports Arena || 3–40
|- align="center" bgcolor="bbffbb"
| 44 || January 31 || Dallas Mavericks || 110–98 || McNichols Sports Arena || 4–40

|- align="center" bgcolor="edbebf"
| 45 || February 2 || Chicago Bulls || 72–111 || McNichols Sports Arena || 4–41
|- align="center" bgcolor="edbebf"
| 46 || February 4 || Sacramento Kings || 99–101 || McNichols Sports Arena || 4–42
|- align="center" bgcolor="bbffbb"
| 47 || February 10 || Boston Celtics || 112–99 || McNichols Sports Arena || 5–42
|- align="center" bgcolor="edbebf"
| 48 || February 12 || @ Sacramento Kings || 84–87 || ARCO Arena || 5–43
|- align="center" bgcolor="edbebf"
| 49 || February 13 || Minnesota Timberwolves || 80–107 || McNichols Sports Arena || 5–44
|- align="center" bgcolor="edbebf"
| 50 || February 15 || @ Portland Trail Blazers || 82–117 || Rose Garden Arena || 5–45
|- align="center" bgcolor="edbebf"
| 51 || February 17  || New York Knicks || 77–91 || McNichols Sports Arena || 5–46
|- align="center" bgcolor="edbebf"
| 52 || February 19 || @ Los Angeles Lakers || 114–132 || Great Western Forum || 5–47
|- align="center" bgcolor="edbebf"
| 53 || February 20 || @ Golden State Warriors || 88–95 || The Arena in Oakland || 5–48
|- align="center" bgcolor="edbebf"
| 54 || February 22 || @ Seattle SuperSonics || 68–88 || KeyArena || 5–49
|- align="center" bgcolor="edbebf"
| 55 || February 23 || Charlotte Hornets || 98–118 || McNichols Sports Arena || 5–50
|- align="center" bgcolor="edbebf"
| 56 || February 25 || Atlanta Hawks || 88–112 || McNichols Sports Arena || 5–51
|- align="center" bgcolor="edbebf"
| 57 || February 27 || Philadelphia 76ers || 78–79 || McNichols Sports Arena || 5–52

|- align="center" bgcolor="edbebf"
| 58 || March 1 || @ Indiana Pacers || 63–90 || Market Square Arena || 5–53
|- align="center" bgcolor="edbebf"
| 59 || March 3 || @ Chicago Bulls || 90–118 || United Center || 5–54
|- align="center" bgcolor="edbebf"
| 60 || March 5 || @ Milwaukee Bucks || 87–104 || Bradley Center || 5–55
|- align="center" bgcolor="edbebf"
| 61 || March 6 || @ Atlanta Hawks || 94–115 || Georgia Dome || 5–56
|- align="center" bgcolor="edbebf"
| 62 || March 8 || Los Angeles Clippers || 89–100 || McNichols Sports Arena || 5–57
|- align="center" bgcolor="edbebf"
| 63 || March 10 || Phoenix Suns || 106–104 || McNichols Sports Arena || 5–58
|- align="center" bgcolor="bbffbb"
| 64 || March 12 || Vancouver Grizzlies || 98–93 || McNichols Sports Arena || 6–58
|- align="center" bgcolor="bbffbb"
| 65 || March 14 || Portland Trail Blazers || 92–82 || McNichols Sports Arena || 7–58
|- align="center" bgcolor="edbebf"
| 66 || March 16 || Charlotte Hornets || 87–109 || Charlotte Coliseum || 7–59
|- align="center" bgcolor="bbffbb"
| 67 || March 17 || @ Washington Wizards || 90–89 || MCI Center || 8–59
|- align="center" bgcolor="edbebf"
| 68 || March 19 || @ Toronto Raptors || 103–104 OT || SkyDome || 8–60
|- align="center" bgcolor="edbebf"
| 69 || March 20 || @ Minnesota Timberwolves || 88–104 || Target Center || 8–61
|- align="center" bgcolor="edbebf"
| 70 || March 23 || Los Angeles Lakers || 86–107 || McNichols Sports Arena || 8–62
|- align="center" bgcolor="edbebf"
| 71 || March 25 || Dallas Mavericks || 94–105 || McNichols Sports Arena || 8–63
|- align="center" bgcolor="bbffbb"
| 72 || March 27 || Golden State Warriors || 97–89 || McNichols Sports Arena || 9–63

|- align="center" bgcolor="edbebf"
| 73 || April 1 || Milwaukee Bucks || 100–106 || McNichols Sports Arena || 9–64
|- align="center" bgcolor="edbebf"
| 74 || April 3 || @ Utah Jazz || 75–97 || Delta Center || 9–65
|- align="center" bgcolor="edbebf"
| 75 || April 5 || Seattle SuperSonics || 83–87 || McNichols Sports Arena || 9–66
|- align="center" bgcolor="edbebf"
| 76 || April 7 || Houston Rockets || 87–104 || McNichols Sports Arena || 9–67
|- align="center" bgcolor="bbffbb"
| 77 || April 9 || Sacramento Kings || 128–103 || McNichols Sports Arena || 10–67
|- align="center" bgcolor="edbebf"
| 78 || April 11 || @ Dallas Mavericks || 81–99 || Reunion Arena || 10–68
|- align="center" bgcolor="edbebf"
| 79 || April 14 || @ Houston Rockets || 88–94 || The Summit || 10–69
|- align="center" bgcolor="edbebf"
| 80 || April 15 || @ Phoenix Suns || 89–96 || America West Arena ||  10–70
|- align="center" bgcolor="bbffbb"
| 81 || April 17 || Portland Trail Blazers || 109–101 || McNichols Sports Arena || 11–70
|- align="center" bgcolor="edbebf"
| 82 || April 19 || @ San Antonio Spurs || 82–96 || Alamodome || 11–71
|-

Player statistics

Awards and records
 Bobby Jackson, NBA All-Rookie Team 2nd Team

Transactions

References

See also
 1997–98 NBA season

Denver Nuggets seasons
1997 in sports in Colorado
1998 in sports in Colorado
Denver Nug